Kristian Lipar (born 7 March 1990) is a Croatian water polo player. He is a former player of VK Solaris. He is 6 ft 7 in (2.00 m) tall and weighs 231 lb (105 kg).

References

External links

Kristian Lipar iz Medvešćaka novo je pojačanje Vaterpolo kluba Solaris

1990 births
Living people
Croatian male water polo players
Sportspeople from Zagreb